The Regional Municipality of York, also called York Region, is a regional municipality in Southern Ontario, Canada, between Lake Simcoe and Toronto. The region was established after the passing of then Bill 102, An Act to Establish The Regional Municipality of York, in 1970. It replaced the former York County in 1971, and is part of the Greater Toronto Area and the inner ring of the Golden Horseshoe. The regional government is headquartered in Newmarket.

The 2021 census population was 1,173,334, with a growth rate of 5.7% from 2016. The Government of Ontario expects its population to surpass 1.5 million residents by 2031.  The largest cities in York Region are Markham, Vaughan and Richmond Hill.

History
At a meeting in Richmond Hill on May 6, 1970, officials representing the municipalities of York County approved plans for the creation of a regional government entity to replace York County. The plan had been presented in 1969 by Darcy McKeough, the Ontario Minister of Municipal Affairs, taking about a year to determine municipal boundaries within the new regional government.

The Regional Municipality of York was created by Act of the Legislative Assembly of Ontario in 1970 (Bill 102 An Act to Establish The Regional Municipality of York), which took effect on January 1, 1971. The creation of the regional municipality resulted in the consolidation of the fourteen former municipalities of York County into nine new municipalities:

The township of Whitchurch merged with the town of Stouffville to create the town of Whitchurch–Stouffville, ceding land to Aurora, Newmarket, and Richmond Hill to the west of the proposed Highway 404 and annexing a northern strip of land from the township of Markham. The western boundary of the new town of Markham was defined to be at Yonge Street, where its northern boundary was formed with Richmond Hill (to which it ceded land) and its western boundary with the new town Vaughan. The new town of Vaughan would consist of all communities in the area bounded by Markham and Richmond Hill in the east, Metro Toronto in the south, the periphery of the regional municipality in the west, and the new township of King in the north.

The townships of Georgina, North Gwillimbury, and Sutton were merged into the township of Georgina, and the East Gwillimbury neighbourhood of East Gwillimbury Heights was merged into Newmarket. King formed the northwestern part of the new region, but the eastern lot from Bathurst Street to Yonge Street was ceded to Newmarket, Aurora, and Oak Ridges, the last of which became a part of Richmond Hill. The boundary between Aurora and Newmarket was defined to be St. John's Sideroad, and Newmarket's northern boundary was defined to be Green Lane.

The towns of Aurora, Newmarket, and Richmond Hill were defined to be the growth centres for the regional municipality, which was to become a greenbelt between the denser urban areas of Toronto to the south and Barrie to the north. The growth centres were each restricted to grow to a maximum population of 25,000 by 2000, and the regional municipality to 300,000.

The municipal realignment merged 40% of East Gwillimbury's population into Newmarket. The council of East Gwillimbury voted to amalgamate with Newmarket, but Newmarket council opposed the amalgamation. In the plan presented by McKeough, the councils of the towns of Newmarket and Aurora were given ten years to decide whether or not to amalgamate.

The internal municipal realignments resulted in some politicians residing in a new municipality from that which they represented at the time of realignment. The reeve of Whitchurch Township resided in the western portion of the town that was annexed by Aurora, three East Gwillimbury councillors resided in land annexed by Newmarket, including its future mayor Ray Twinney, and King councillor Gordon Rowe was a resident of Oak Ridges, which became part of Richmond Hill.

Hydro Commissions
Because of the mix of urban and rural areas in the Region, the provision of electricity was governed in a different manner from the rest of the regional services:

 the hydro-electric commissions and public utilities commissions that existed at the end of 1970 continued to provide electricity within their respective areas;
 the councillors of the former Township of Vaughan and the trustees of the former Police Village of King City became members of new Hydro-Electric Commissions for their respective areas;
 Ontario Hydro continued to have responsibility for providing electricity to those portions of the Region that were not served by any of the above commissions.

Electric distribution was partially rationalized in 1978, when:

 hydro-electric commissions were established for all area municipalities except East Gwillimbury (but it could establish a commission later on, subject to Ontario Hydro's consent);
 effective January 1, 1979, all assets of the former commissions in the Region were transferred to the new commissions;
 Ontario Hydro withdrew its provision of services from all areas except those in East Gwillimbury, Georgina, King and Whitchurch-Stouffville;
 Georgina, King and Whitchurch-Stouffville could take over responsibility for such areas at a later date, subject to Ontario Hydro's consent

Police
The York Regional Police was also created at this time, amalgamating the fourteen town, township, and village police forces.

Geography
York Region covers 1,762 square kilometres from Lake Simcoe in the north to the city of Toronto in the south. Its eastern border is shared with Durham Region, to the west is Peel Region, and Simcoe County is to the northwest. A detailed map of the region showing its major roads, communities and points of interest is available.

Towns and cities in York Region include:
Town of Aurora
Town of East Gwillimbury
Town of Georgina
Township of King
City of Markham
Town of Newmarket
City of Richmond Hill
City of Vaughan
Town of Whitchurch–Stouffville

There is also one First Nation with an Indian reserve, where the Chippewas of Georgina Island First Nation reside on Georgina Island, Fox Island and Snake Island.

York Region's landscape includes farmlands, wetlands and kettle lakes, the Oak Ridges Moraine and over 2,070 hectares of regional forest, in addition to the built-up areas of its municipalities. The highest point in the region is within the rolling hills of the moraine near Dufferin St. & Aurora Side Road at 360m ASL (1,243 feet)

Climate
York Region is situated in the humid continental climate (Köppen Dfb) zone with warm summers and cold winters, ample snowfall, more in the northern part of York region much of it derived from the wind driven snowbelt streamer activity.

Government

The region is governed by York Regional Council, which consists of 20 elected representatives from each of the constituent towns and cities in the region. These include each of the nine mayors, and 11 regional councillors who are elected from the constituent municipalities as follows:
1 from Georgina
1 from Newmarket
2 from Richmond Hill
3 from Vaughan
4 from Markham

The leader of Council is referred to as "Regional Chair and CEO". Wayne Emmerson, a former mayor of Whitchurch-Stouffville, was elected to this office in December 2014.

In October 2008, York Regional Municipality was named one of Greater Toronto's Top Employers by Mediacorp Canada Inc.

Federal and provincial representation
Starting with the 2015 federal election, York Region encompasses all or part of the federal electoral districts of Aurora—Oak Ridges—Richmond Hill, King—Vaughan, Markham—Stouffville, Markham—Thornhill, Markham—Unionville, Newmarket—Aurora, Richmond Hill, Thornhill, Vaughan—Woodbridge, and York—Simcoe.

Provincially, York Region is represented in the Legislative Assembly of Ontario by Members of Provincial Parliament for the electoral districts of Aurora—Oak Ridges—Richmond Hill, Markham—Unionville, Newmarket—Aurora, Markham—Thornhill, Markham—Stouffville, Richmond Hill, Thornhill, King—Vaughan, Vaughan—Woodbridge, and York—Simcoe.

Economy

The economy of York Region is diverse. In general, the economy includes a full range of businesses from industrial to high-tech to rural/agricultural. New developments continually consume space year after year, and tend to be focused along the Yonge Street corridor from Vaughan/Richmond Hill in the south to Newmarket/Aurora in the north. There are ongoing conflicts between conservationists and developers over land use. Most contentious is the conflict use of the Oak Ridges Moraine.

Shopping

Major shopping centres in York Region include:
 Aurora North Smart Centre (Aurora)
 Hillcrest Mall (Richmond Hill)
 Green Lane Centre (East Gwillimbury)
 King Square Shopping Mall (Markham)
 Markville Shopping Centre (Markham)
 Pacific Mall (Markham)
 The Promenade Shopping Centre (Vaughan)
 Times Square (Richmond Hill)
 Langham Square (Markham)
 Upper Canada Mall (Newmarket)
 Woodside Mall (Markham)
 Vaughan Mills (Vaughan)
 First Markham Place (Markham)

Demographics
York is the third-largest census division in Ontario, following Toronto and Peel Region, and seventh-largest in Canada.

Language 
In the 2021 Canadian census, English is the mother tongue of 45.5% of the residents of York Region. Cantonese is the mother tongue for 9.7% of the population, followed by Mandarin (8.7%), Italian (4.0%), Persian (4.4%) and Russian (3.1%).

Ethnicity 
As of 2021, the most common ethnic groups are Chinese (22.6%), Italian (12.5%) and English (7.4%).

Religion 
According to the 2021 census, the most reported religion among the population was Christianity (45.3%), with Catholicism (25.2%) making up the largest denomination. This was followed by Islam (7.8%), Judaism (5.2%), Hinduism (5.0%), Buddhism (2.6%) and Sikhism (1.0%). 32.5% of the population did not identify with a particular religion.

Health care
There are currently four hospitals within the Municipality of York including:
 Cortellucci Vaughan Hospital
 Markham Stouffville Hospital
 Mackenzie Richmond Hill Hospital
 Southlake Regional Health Centre
All four hospitals are part of the Local Health Integration Network (LHIN) Hospital Partnerships.

Boomerang Health, in Vaughan, is a centre that provides multidisciplinary rehabilitation and medical services geared specifically for children and adolescents, in collaboration with The Hospital for Sick Children.

Transportation

The arterial road network in York Region is a grid, with most roads running north–south or east–west. This was done under the orders of British surveyor Augustus Jones during the 1790s. York Region assigned approximately 50 roads as York Regional Routes, meaning that the cost of maintaining of these roads is paid for by York Region.

The major highways in the Region are:
Highway 7 (east-west)
Highway 9 (east-west)
Highway 48 (north-south)
Highway 400 (north-south)
Highway 404 (north-south)
Highway 407 (east-west)
Highway 427 (north-south)

Former highways include:
Highway 11 (north-south)
Highway 27 (north-south)
Highway 47 (east-west)
Highway 49 (east-west)
Highway 50 (north-south)
Note: Highway 27 and Highway 50 are still referred to as such on municipal road signs, but are no longer provincial highways.

Air transportation

Most air travel is served by Toronto Pearson International Airport, which is outside of York Region and is Canada's largest airport. Buttonville Municipal Airport is a regional airport in Markham, used for general aviation and business aircraft. Markham Airport is a private aerodrome in Markham. There are also a few unpaved airports serving the region: Hare Field in Holland Landing (East Gwillimbury), Belhaven Airport in Georgina, and Stouffville Aerodrome north of Stouffville.

Public transportation

York Region is served by:
York Region Transit (YRT), which includes the Viva bus rapid transit network
GO Transit, which offers bus and train service
Toronto Transit Commission (TTC), which has several bus routes which cross York's southern border, and which provide service along many north–south arterial streets in Vaughan, Richmond Hill and Markham. Since December 17, 2017, Central Vaughan has been served by the University portion of the Line 1 Yonge-University of Toronto's subway system, and a future extension of the Yonge Street portion of the line will eventually serve eastern Vaughan, Richmond Hill, and Markham.

Until 2001, the towns of York Region operated separate public transit services, which did not connect very well with each other.  YRT was created by the Regional Government to combine five of these services:
 Vaughan Transit
 Markham Transit
 Richmond Hill Transit
 Aurora Transit - merged in 1999 with Newmarket Transit
 Newmarket Transit

Since 2001, bus routes have been extensively enhanced in the five communities which had pre-existing services, but YRT's services to East Gwillimbury is limited to two routes, and service to King, Georgina and Whitchurch-Stouffville are even more limited due to the relatively small populations in each of those towns.

Water
Water in southern York is provided by Toronto Water and Peel Region by way of 3 pumping stations and reservoirs (Bayview, Dufferin and Milliken (tank and underground reservoir)) using water from Lake Ontario. Keswick and Sutton obtain water from Lake Simcoe by way of water treatment plants. The remainder of York obtains water from a combination of water from Lake Ontario and underground wells. Some wells are maintained by the Region and the rest privately.

 Georgina -water from Lake Simcoe and private wells
 East Gwillimbury - region and private wells
 Newmarket - region wells and water from Lake Ontario
 Whitchurch-Stouffville - Region wells, water from Lake Ontario, private wells
 Markham - water from Lake Ontario and private wells
 Richmond Hill - water from Lake Ontario and private wells
 Aurora - water from Lake Ontario and private wells
 Vaughan - water from Lake Ontario and private wells
 King - water from Lake Ontario, Region and private wells

Water is distributed from 14 water pumping stations and stored at 37 elevated tanks and reservoirs:

List of water tanks

 Reesor Park water tank - built 1971, now out of service and dismantled
 Newmarket - 211 Harry Walker Parkway South
 Richmond Hill - 81 Coons Road
 Schomberg - 186 Church Street, built 1997
 King - 60 Fisher Street, built 1982
 Stouffville - 12519 Tenth Line, built 1984
 Stouffville - Bethesda Rd, built 2005
 Aurora - 126 Allenvale Drive, 240 Orchard Heights Boulevard, built 1984
 Aurora - 180 Bloomington Road, built 2008
 Markham - 4355 14th Avenue

Treatment Plants

 Sutton Water Treatment Plant - closed
 Georgina Water Treatment Plant - replaces Sutton plant
 Keswick Water Treatment Plant
 Schomberg Water Treatment Plant

Education

Four public school boards operate primary and secondary institutions in York Region, Conseil scolaire catholique MonAvenir (CSCM), Conseil scolaire Viamonde (CSV), the York Catholic District School Board (YCDSB), and the York Region District School Board (YRDSB). CSV and YRDSB operate as secular public school boards, the former operating French first language institution, whereas the latter operated English first language institutions. The other two school boards, MonAvenir and YCDSB, operate as public separate school boards, the former operating French first language separate schools, the latter operating English first language separate schools.

YRDSB is the largest public school board in the region, operating 175 elementary schools, and 33 secondary schools. YCDSB operates 83 elementary schools, and 15 secondary schools, while MonAvenir operates five elementary schools, and two secondary schools. CSV is the smallest public school board in the York Region, operating three elementary schools, and one secondary school in the region.

Along with public schools, the region also holds a number of religious and private schools including:

 As-Sadiq Islamic School (Vaughan)
 Academy for Gifted Children (Richmond Hill)
 Country Day School (King)
 Holy Trinity School (Richmond Hill)
 Leo Baeck Day School (Vaughan)
 Ner Israel Yeshiva College (Vaughan)
 Netivot HaTorah Day School (Vaughan)
 Pickering College (Newmarket)
 St. Andrew's College (Aurora)
 St. Thomas of Villanova College (King)
 Town Centre Montessori Private School (Markham)
 Toronto Waldorf School (Vaughan)

In addition to primary and secondary levels of education, the region is also home to post-secondary institutions such as Seneca College. The college operates three campuses spread throughout York Region, in King, Markham and Newmarket, as well as additional campuses in Toronto. The region presently does not host a university, but a Markham campus of York University is under construction as of August 2022.

News media
York Region Media Group
CKVR - CTV Two (based in Barrie)
 CFU758 - 90.7 RAV FM (Vaughan)
CKDX 88.5FM - Foxy 88-5 (Newmarket)
CFMS-FM - 105.9 The Region (Markham)
CIWS-FM - WhiStle Community Radio Whitchurch–Stouffville
York's news media is also served by the outlets based in Toronto.

Attractions
York Region has an unusual assortment of points of interest, ranging from nature reserves to pioneer-era museums, to a modern amusement park.

Vaughan's major attractions include the McMichael Canadian Art Collection, in the community of Kleinburg, that features works by Canadian artists including Inuit and First Nations artists. Canada's Wonderland, which features roller coasters and other rides, concerts and fireworks shows, is also in Vaughan.

Heritage sites and historical museums in the Region include:
Hillary House National Historic Site (Aurora)
Historic Main Street Newmarket (Newmarket)
Georgina Military Museum (Georgina)
Georgina Village Museum (Georgina)
King Township Museum (King)
Markham Museum (Markham)
RHLS Narrow Gauge Railway (Whitchurch–Stouffville)
Sharon Temple National Historic Site (East Gwillimbury)
Whitchurch-Stouffville Museum (Whitchurch–Stouffville)
York-Durham Heritage Railway (Whitchurch–Stouffville)

Following is a sample of other attractions in the area:
Applewood Farm Winery (Whitchurch–Stouffville)
Canadian Heritage Humber River
Fred Varley Art Gallery (Markham)
Canada's Wonderland (Vaughan)
Oak Ridges Trail
Puck's Farm (King)
Richmond Hill Centre for the Performing Arts
Sutton-Zephyr Trail
Willow Springs Winery (Whitchurch–Stouffville)
Words Alive Literary Festival (East Gwillimbury)
Bare Oaks Family Naturist Park (East Gwillimbury)
York Demonstration Forest (Whitchurch–Stouffville)

Travel Region

York Region lies within the Central Counties of Ontario, a tourism related association.

Protected areas

Baker Sugarbush Conservation Area
Boyd Conservation Area
Bruce's Mill Conservation Area
Duclos Point Provincial Nature Reserve
Gold Creek Conservation Area
Holland Landing Prairie Provincial Nature Reserve
Kortright Centre for Conservation
Lake St. George Conservation Area
Mabel Davis Conservation Area
Milne Park
Pickering Lands Preservation Site
Rogers Reservoir Conservation Area 
Sheppards Bush Conservation Area
Sibbald Point Provincial Park
Thornton Bales King Conservation Area
Wesley Brooks Memorial Conservation Area (known as "Fairy Lake" locally)
Whitchurch Conservation Area
Willow Beach Conservation Area

Sister city

 Omsk (Russia)

The Region of York signed a "Twinning Agreement" with the city of Omsk, Russia, on August 28, 1997, after it signed a "Friendship Agreement" one year previous.

Adjacent census divisions

See also
List of municipalities in Ontario
Greater Toronto Area
Province of Toronto
List of secondary schools in Ontario#Regional Municipality of York

Notes

References

External links

1971 establishments in Ontario
 
Populated places established in 1971
York